Tobias Böckers is the head of the Institute of Anatomy and Cellbiology at the University of Ulm. He was born in Rheda-Wiedenbrück on 2 August 1964. After his medical education he specialized in anatomy and neurobiology. He was President of the Anatomische Gesellschaft from 2010 to 2014.

References

1964 births
Living people
German anatomists
Academic staff of the University of Ulm